"Cecilia and the Satellite" is a song by Andrew McMahon in the Wilderness, written by James Flannigan, Anders Grahn, and Andrew McMahon. It released as the lead single from McMahon's self-titled debut album Andrew McMahon in the Wilderness on August 12, 2014. The song hit radio on August 19, 2014. It was written for his daughter, Cecilia.

Music video
The official music video for the song, lasting three minutes and forty-three seconds, was uploaded on December 5, 2014, to McMahon's Vevo channel on YouTube. It was directed by Olivier Agostini. The video depicts Cecilia as a baby being shown a book by her father intercut with scenes showing a young woman, presumably Cecilia, walking and swimming in the locations depicted in the book. It is implied that the latter scenes are being imagined by the infant Cecilia.

Track listing

Chart performance
"Cecilia and the Satellite" was a commercial success, particularly in the U.S., becoming a top-ten hit on multiple genre-specific charts, and briefly charted on the all-format Billboard Hot 100.

Peak positions

Year-end charts

Release history

References

2014 songs
2014 singles
Vanguard Records singles
Songs written by Anders Grahn
Songs written by James Flannigan (songwriter)
Songs written by Andrew McMahon